Trade Unions in India are registered and file annual returns under the Trade Union Act (1926). Statistics on Trade Unions are collected annually by the Labour Bureau of the Ministry of Labour, Government of India. As per the latest data, released for 2012, there were 16,154 trade unions which had a combined membership of 9.18 million (based on returns from 15 States – out of a total of 28 States and 9 Union Territories). The Trade Union movement in India is largely divided along political lines and follows a pre-Independence pattern of overlapping interactions between political parties and unions.  The net result of this type of system is debated as it has both advantages and disadvantages. According to the data submitted by various trade unions to the Ministry of Labour and Employment as part of a survey, INTUC with a combined membership of 33.3 million, has emerged as the largest trade union in India as of 2013.

The firm or industry level trade unions are often affiliated to larger Federations. The largest Federations in the country represent labour at the National level and are known as Bharatiya Mazdoor Sangh  (BMS). As of 2002, when the last Trade Union verification was carried out, there are 12 CTUOs recognised by the Ministry of Labour.

History

The setting up of textile and clothing mills around the port cities of Bombay (now Mumbai), Calcutta (now Kolkata), Madras (now Chennai) and Surat in the second half of the 19th century led to the beginnings of the industrial workforce in India. Several incidents of strikes and protests by workers have been recorded during this time. The credit for the first association of Indian workers is generally given to the Bombay Mill-Hands Association founded by N.M. Lokhande in 1890. This was in the period just after the passing of the 'First' Factories Act in 1881 by the British Government of the time. The following years saw the formation of several labour associations and unions. The first clearly registered trade-union is considered to be the Madras Labour Union founded by B.P. Wadia in 1918, while the first trade union federation to be set up was the All India Trade Union Congress in 1920.

Following the rapid growth of unions around the time of the First World War, the Russian Revolution and the setting up of the ILO - industrial conflict began to increase and over 1,000 strikes were recorded between 1920 and 1924. The waves of strikes boiled over with the arrest of prominent leaders and trade-unionists in the infamous 'Cawnpore Conspiracy case' in 1924 with the union leaders being arrested and accused of attempting a Communist revolution to try and overthrow the ruling British government. Subsequently, the Trade Union Act (1926) was passed which created the rules for the regulation and closer monitoring of Trade Unions. In the first year of the law's operation, 28 unions registered and submitted returns with a total membership 100,619. The number of unions grew rapidly after that and by the time of Independence of India in 1947, there were 2,766 unions registered which had a combined membership of over 1.66 million. This resulted in a wide influence of unions and workers' organisations and led to significantly favourable social legislation being enacted in the first decade of Independence. Several important labour laws were passed during this time.

Independence (1947) to liberalisation (1991)

Following its Independence in 1947 and the formation of the Republic in 1950, India largely followed a Socialist economic approach encouraging public sector employment and pro-worker legislations. The trade-union movement reflected the main political divisions of the time and was divided mainly along Socialist and Communist lines. The subsequent decades saw significant expansion in trade union membership with the number of active unions reaching its peak in the mid-1970s and mid-1980s. While the 1970s in India was a period characterised by political instability, the 1980s was characterised by the beginnings of a distinct turn towards more market-friendly policies, support for industrialists and an implicit opposition to workers. Two key events during this period were the 1974 railway strike in India and the Great Bombay textile strike of 1982, the latter of which subsequently led to a long and complicated stalemate.

Liberalisation (1991) to present

The period following the Economic liberalisation in 1991 was characterised by declining government intervention in the economy, a decline in the creation of public sector employment and encouragement for the private sector. Efforts for unionisation in the private sectors were often met with opposition and the wider general withdrawal of State support for workers further undermined their bargaining power. These policies led to a stagnation in the number of unionised formal sector workers.

A gradual shift in focus about the importance of the Informal sector and 'Informal employment in the formal sector' from the late 1990s onwards meant that trade unions also began to focus on these workers. This has led to greater enrolment of these workers and subsequently led to increases in union membership. The Central Trade Union Organisations (CTU's) increased their combined membership from 13.21 million in 1989 to 24.85 million in 2002. Almost all the CTUOs now have at least 20 percent of their official members coming from the informal sector.

Image gallery

Barathiya Mazdoor Sabha (BMS)

Local, firm-level or industry-level trade unions are often affiliated to larger Federations. The largest Federations in the country represent labour at the National level and are known as Barathiya Mazdoor Sabha (BMS). To acquire status as a BMS, a trade union federation must have a verified membership of at least 500,000 workers who are spread over a minimum of four states and four industries (including agriculture). Trade-union membership verification is usually done once in a decade and an updated verification with new criteria is currently underway, with 2011 as the reference year. Complications around membership verification have existed due to discrepancies between membership claimed by the unions and actual members. These complications have increased in recent years following the wider inclusion of informal sector workers in union membership data.

The International Labour Organization has listed 12 organisations which are officially recognised as BMS under terms the Ministry of Labour.

Other trade unions and centres

(Incomplete list, In Alphabetical order)

 Akhil Bharatiya Kamgar Sena (Akhil Bharatiya Sena)
 All India Bank Employees Association - AIBEA (affiliated with All India Trade Union Congress)
 All India Insurance Workers Union (Affiliated to PWPI i.e Progressive Workers and Peasants of India)
 All India Bank Officers' Association - AIBOA (Non political Independent Organisation)
 All India Bank Officers' Confederation (Non political Independent Organisation)
 All India Punjab National Bank Officers' Association (Affiliated to AIBOC)
 All India Centre of Trade Unions (Marxist Communist Party of India (United))
 All India Federation of Trade Unions (Marxist–Leninists)
 All India Railwaymen's Federation (AIRF) (affiliated with Hind Mazdoor Sabha)
 All India Workers Trade Union (Affiliated to PWPI i.e. Progressive Workers and Peasants of India)
 Andhra Pradesh Federation of Trade Unions (Communist Party of India (Marxist–Leninist))
 Anna Thozhil Sanga Peravai (All India Anna Dravida Munnetra Kazhagam)
 Archaeological Survey of India Workers Union, New Delhi 
 Bharatiya Kamgar Sena (Shiv Sena)
 Bharatiya Khadya Nigam Karamchari Sangh- BKNK SANGH (Nationally recognised Employees union of Food Corporation of India with Pan India presence)
Bharatiya Khet Mazdoor Union-BKMU (Communist party of India) 
 Bharatiya Mazdoor Sabha (Provisional Central Committee, Communist Party of India (Marxist–Leninist))
 Bihar-Jharkhand Sales Representatives' Union BSSR Union (BSSR Union) Affiliated to CITU & FMRAI
 Bihari Peasants Union (Affiliated to PWPI i.e. Progressive Workers and Peasants of India)
 Confederation of Free Trade Unions of India (CFTUI) (Non-political affiliated Unions of India )
 Dronagiri General Kamgar Union (Affiliated to PWPI i.e. Progressive Workers and Peasants of India)
 Federation of Medical & Sales Representatives'Association of India affiliated to CITU.
 Hind Mazdoor Kisan Panchayat (Janata Dal (United))
 Independent Labour Union  (Unaffiliated)
 Indian Confederation of Labour
 Indian Federation of Trade Unions (Communist Party of India (Marxist–Leninist) New Democracy)
 Indian National Trinamool Trade Union Congress
 Indian Railways Technical Supervisors' Association (IRTSA)
 Jharkhand Mazdoor Sangha
 Kamgar Ekta
 Kerala Trade Union Congress (Kerala Congress, KTUC (B) belongs to KC (B), KTUC (M) belongs to KC (M), etc.)
 Maharashtra General Kamgar Union (Kamgar Aghadi)
 Marumalarchi Labour Front (MDMK) 
Nascent IT Employees Senate - NITES (Regd.) 
 Nirman Mazdoor Sangh Delhi (REGd.)
 Progressive Workers and Peasants of India (Janardan Singh is Founder and General Secretary)
 Pattali Trade Union (Pattali Makkal Katchi)
 Rajdhani Nirman Mazdoor Kalyan Sangh, New Delhi
 Raigad Shramik Aekta Sangh (Affiliated to PWPI i.e. Progressive Workers and Peasants of India)
 Rashtrawadi Mathadi and General Labour Union (National Congress Party NCP)
 Rashtriya Mulnivasi Bahujan Karmachari Sangh (BAMCEF) - RMBKS
 Shramik Vikas Sangathan(SVS) (Aam Aadmi Party)
 Socialist Trade Union Centre (SNDP)
 Swatantra Thozhilali Union (Indian Union Muslim League)
 Telugu Nadu Trade Union Council (Telugu Desam Party)
 Trade Union Centre of India (Communist Party of India (Marxist–Leninist))
 United Trade Union Congress (Bolshevik) (Revolutionary Socialist Party (Bolshevik))
 United Trade Union Congress (Marxist) (Revolutionary Socialist Party (Marxist))
 BVVS- Bharathiya Vyapari Vyavasayi Sankh  (Supporting To BJP and RSS)
 West Bengal Medical and Sales' Representatives Union
 West Bengal state electricity board employees union (affiliated to INTTUC, Affiliation No 505)
 West Bengal State Electricity Workmen's Union (affiliated to CITU & EEFI)
 Webanker (Trade Union for Bank Employees)

Notable trade union leaders in India
(In Alphabetical order)
Ardhendu Bhushan Bardhan
B. P. Wadia
Bindeshwari Dubey
Chaturanan Mishra
Datta Samant
Dattopant Thengadi
Diwan Chaman Lall
George Fernandes
Gurudas Dasgupta
Indrajit Gupta
Kalyan Roy 
Narayan Malhar Joshi
Narayan Meghaji Lokhande
Ramdev Singh
S.A. Dange
S.S. Mirajkar
S.V. Ghate
B.T. Ranadive

Participants
According to the Periodic Labour Force Survey (PLFS) of 2019, it shows that the Indian economy has shrunk for the first time in four decades, from 467.7 million in 2011-12 to 461.5 million in 2017-18. Agriculture experienced the most massive layoffs, with 29.3 million workers losing their jobs. Women account for the vast majority of those who have lost their jobs (24.7 million).

See also 

 List of trade unions in Indian tea gardens
 List of trade unions in the Singareni coal fields

References

 
Labour movement in India
Indian labour law